Bespoke Songs, Lost Dogs, Detours & Rendezvous is a 1998 compilation album of songs written by Elvis Costello and performed by various artists. It includes covers of tracks Costello recorded, songs written specifically for other artists and compositions never before released.

Track listing
All songs written by Elvis Costello, except where noted.

References

1998 compilation albums
Rhino Records albums